Gene amplification refers to a number of natural and artificial processes by which the number of copies of a gene is increased "without a proportional increase in other genes".

Artificial DNA amplification 
In research or diagnosis DNA amplification can be conducted through methods such as:

 Polymerase chain reaction, an easy, cheap, and reliable way to repeatedly replicate a focused segment of DNA by polymerizing nucleotides, a concept which is applicable to numerous fields in modern biology and related sciences.
 Ligase chain reaction, a method that amplifies the nucleic acid used as the probe. For each of the two DNA strands, two partial probes are ligated to form the actual one; thus, LCR uses two enzymes: a DNA polymerase (used for initial template amplification and then inactivated) and a thermostable DNA ligase.
 Transcription-mediated amplification, an isothermal, single-tube nucleic acid amplification system utilizing two enzymes, RNA polymerase and reverse transcriptase, to rapidly amplify the target RNA/DNA, enabling the simultaneous detection of multiple pathogenic organisms in a single tube.

Natural DNA amplification 
DNA replication is a natural form of copying DNA with the amount of genes remaining constant. However, the amount of DNA or the number of genes can also increase within an organism through gene duplication, a major mechanism through which new genetic material is generated during molecular evolution. Common sources of gene duplications include ectopic recombination,  retrotransposition event, aneuploidy, polyploidy, and replication slippage.

A piece of DNA or RNA that is the source and/or product of either natural or artificial amplification or replication events is called an amplicon.

References

Molecular genetics